Mount Stephens may refer to:

Canada
Mount Stephens (Stephens Island), British Columbia, Canada
Mount Stephens (British Columbia), Canada
Mount Stephens (Skeena Mountains), British Columbia, Canada
United States
Mount Stephens (Nevada), United States
Prospect Peak (Park County, Wyoming) has also been called Mount Stephens

Antarctica
Mount Stephens (Antarctica)

See also
Mount Stephenson